Devreese is a surname. Notable people with the surname include:

Frédéric Devreese (1929–2020), Dutch-born Belgian composer and conductor
Godefroid Devreese (1861–1941), Belgian sculptor
Jozef T. Devreese (born 1937), Belgian physicist